Vice-Admiral M. Bruce MacLean CMM, CD is a retired officer of the Canadian Forces. He was Chief of the Maritime Staff from 2004 to 2006.

Career
Educated at Dalhousie University, MacLean joined the Canadian Forces in 1970. He became Commanding Officer of the submarine  in 1982. He went on to be Director Maritime Force Development in the Directorate of Submarine Requirements in 1986, Commanding Officer of the supply ship  in 1992 and Chief of Staff to the Commander Maritime Forces Pacific in 1994. He was next appointed Director General Maritime Development in the National Defence Headquarters in 1995, Director General International Security Policy at National Defence Headquarters in 1998 and Commander of Maritime Forces Atlantic in 2000. His final posts were as Canadian Military Representative to the NATO Military Committee in August 2002 and Chief of the Maritime Staff in 2004 before retiring in 2006.

Awards and decorations

MacLean's personal awards and decorations include the following:

110px

He was a qualified Submariner and as such wore the Canadian Forces Submariner Dolphins

References

Living people
Royal Canadian Navy officers
Commanders of the Order of Military Merit (Canada)
Canadian admirals
Year of birth missing (living people)
Commanders of the Royal Canadian Navy